is a river that flows from Hanyu, Saitama to Edogawa, Tokyo, Japan. At the river's end, it merges with the Arakawa River.

External links
 (confluence with Ara River)

Rivers of Ibaraki Prefecture
Rivers of Saitama Prefecture
Rivers of Tokyo
Rivers of Japan